Salarias is a genus of combtooth blennies found in the Indian and Pacific oceans.

Species
There are currently 13 recognized species in this genus:
 Salarias alboguttatus Kner, 1867 (White-spotted blenny)
 Salarias ceramensis Bleeker, 1853 (Seram blenny)
 Salarias fasciatus (Bloch, 1786) (Jewelled blenny)
 Salarias guttatus Valenciennes, 1836 (Breast-spot blenny)
 Salarias luctuosus Whitley, 1929
 Salarias nigrocinctus Bath, 1996
 Salarias obscurus Bath, 1992
 Salarias patzneri Bath, 1992 (Patzner's blenny)
 Salarias ramosus Bath, 1992 (Starry blenny)
 Salarias segmentatus Bath & J. E. Randall, 1991 (Segmented blenny)
 Salarias sexfilum Günther, 1861
 Salarias sibogai Bath, 1992
 Salarias sinuosus Snyder, 1908 (Fringelip blenny)

References 

Taxa named by Georges Cuvier
 
Salarinae